The Guanyin Creek is a seasonal river located in the left (western) bank of Xiang River, Pingtang Subdistrict of Yuelu District, Changsha, Hunan, China. The creek flows east through Hongqiao Village and Guanyingang Community, the creek joins Xiang River at Yangjiazui.

References

Rivers of Changsha
Tributaries of the Xiang River